Iklehra is a census town in Dewas district in the Indian state of Madhya Pradesh.

Geography
It has an average elevation of 457 metres (1,499 feet).

Demographics
 India census, Iklehra had a population of 9,206. Males constitute 52% of the population and females 48%. Iklehra has an average literacy rate of 67%, higher than the national average of 59.5%: male literacy is 76%, and female literacy is 58%. In Iklehra, 12% of the population is under 6 years of age. There are five schools.

Transport
The nearest airport is Jabalpur.

References

Cities and towns in Chhindwara district